Clivina americana is a species of ground beetle in the subfamily Scaritinae, found in North America. It was described by Pierre François Marie Auguste Dejean in 1831.

References

americana
Beetles described in 1831